Acanthomyrmex glabfemoralis is a species of ant that belongs to the genus Acanthomyrmex. It was described by Moffett in 1986, and is abundant in Vietnam and China.

References

Insects described in 1997
glabfemoralis
Insects of Vietnam
Insects of China